The Fighting Skipper is a 1923 American adventure film serial directed by Francis Ford. The film is considered to be lost.

Cast
Peggy O'Day (as Skipper)
 Jack Perrin
 William White (as Bill White)
 Francis Ford
 Steve Murphy

See also
 List of film serials
 List of film serials by studio
 List of lost films

References

External links

1923 films
American silent serial films
American black-and-white films
Lost American films
Films directed by Francis Ford
1923 adventure films
Treasure hunt films
American adventure films
1923 lost films
1920s American films
Silent adventure films